Ernesto Barrera (died 28 November 1978) was a Roman Catholic priest from El Salvador. He served several communities in the department of San Salvador, under Archbishop Óscar Romero.

Barrera was killed in a shoot-out with the National Guard on 28 November 1978. Afterward, the government claimed that he had been a member of the guerrilla group Fuerzas Populares de Liberación (FPL). Archbishop Romero questioned the truth of this assertion, but later received a letter from the FPL leadership confirming that Barrera had indeed been a member.

References

1978 deaths
Assassinated Salvadoran people
Assassinated religious leaders
Human rights abuses in El Salvador
People murdered in El Salvador
20th-century Salvadoran Roman Catholic priests
Year of birth missing
20th-century Roman Catholic martyrs
Catholic martyrs of El Salvador
1978 crimes in El Salvador
1978 murders in North America
1970s murders in El Salvador